Diyan Lefterov (born 6 June 1988) is a Bulgarian footballer who plays as a defender.

Career
In November 2012, he made his 120th league appearance for Neftochimic.  On 2 August 2016, he left Pomorie. On 19 June 2017, Lefterov was announced as one of Sozopol's new signings.

References

External links 
 
 

1988 births
Living people
Bulgarian footballers
Neftochimic Burgas players
FC Pomorie players
FC Sozopol players
First Professional Football League (Bulgaria) players
Second Professional Football League (Bulgaria) players
Association football defenders